Miyuki Kano (狩野美雪 Kano Miyuki, born May 17, 1977) is a Japanese volleyball player who plays for Fortuna Odense Volley.
She served as the Captain of Hisamitsu Springs between 2007 and 2010.

Clubs
 HachioujiJissen High School
 TokyoGakugei Univ.
 Mobara Alcas (2000–2006)
 Hisamitsu Springs (2006–2010)
 Fortuna Odense Volley (2010-2011) (:dk)

Awards

Individuals 
2004 - 10th V.League (Japan) Servereceive award

National team
2008: 5th place in the Olympic Games of Beijing

References

External links
FIVB Biography
Fortuna-odense official website

Living people
1977 births
Japanese women's volleyball players
Olympic volleyball players of Japan
Volleyball players at the 2008 Summer Olympics
People from Mitaka, Tokyo